Francisco Julião Arruda de Paula (1915-1999) was a Brazilian lawyer, politician and writer. He was born in Recife to a family of landowners. After studying law at university, he dedicated himself to defending peasants who had been expelled from their lands. He helped to found the farmers' cooperative Ligas Camponesas (Peasant League) in 1956, which worked on multiple fronts to advance peasants' rights in Pernambuco. Juliao gained renown as one of the most committed defenders of agrarian reform in mid-century Brazil.

He was state deputy for the Brazilian Socialist Party between 1952 and 1964, and visited the USSR and Cuba, the latter with President Janio Quadros. Elected federal deputy in 1962, he was arrested after the 1964 coup, but was released the following year. He then went into exile in Mexico, where he remained for many years. He returned to Brazil after amnesty was granted in 1979. He died in Cuernavaca in 1999.

As an author, he published essays, short stories and novels. Among his best-known books are Cachaça (1951), Irmão Juazeiro (1961), O Que São Ligas Camponesas (1962) and Cambão: La Cara Oculta de Brasil (1968). Cambao was published in English translation as part of the Pelican Latin American Library series.

References

Brazilian politicians
1915 births
1999 deaths